By-elections are held in Italy whenever a parliamentary seat becomes vacant in either the Chamber of Deputies or the Senate of the Republic. By-elections were introduced by the electoral law of 2017.

Overview 
The new Italian electoral law approved in 2017 and nicknamed Rosatellum, provides the election of members of Parliament in 232 single-member districts for the Chamber of Deputies and in 116 for the Senate of the Republic. Whenever a seat of this kind becomes vacant, a by-election is called, and a new representative is elected.

List of by-elections 
2019 Italian by-elections
2020 Italian by-elections
2021 Italian by-elections
2022 Italian by-elections

References